The Reformed Church is a church in Șimleu Silvaniei, rebuilt between 1729 and 1736.

Gallery

References

External links
 Şimleu Silvaniei, Reformed church

Places of worship in Șimleu Silvaniei
Historic monuments in Sălaj County
Reformed churches in Romania
Monuments and memorials in Șimleu Silvaniei
Churches completed in 1736
Churches in Sălaj County
1736 establishments in Europe